The 1897 VFL season was the Geelong Football Club's first season in the Victorian Football League and its first with Jack Conway as captain. Geelong finished the home and away season with 11 wins and 3 losses, finishing in first position and winning the minor premiership. In the final series, Geelong finished with 2 wins and 1 loss, finishing in second position.

The club best and fairest was won by Joe McShane and the leading goalkicker was Eddy James with 27 goals. Eddy James also won the season's leading goalkicker medal equaling Jack Leith of Melbourne.

Playing list 
This was the first ever Geelong Football Club squad in the Victorian Football League, as such, these players all made their debuts in the league. Six players played a total of seventeen games, and Eddy James kicked the most goals with 27. A total of 34 players played for Geelong at least once this season.

Statistics

Season summary

May 
Geelong began their campaign against  at the Corio Oval. The Geelong team, composed largely of new players, were unable to score in the first half. Behind by three goals, Geelong were unable to make a comeback despite an improvement. Geelong lost by 23 points. In Round 2, Geelong travelled to the Melbourne Cricket Ground to play . Geelong had no chance all day as Melbourne defeated Geelong by 45 points. Geelong were much better in the last quarter, though it did not change the outcome of the game. In Round 3, Geelong again travelled to Melbourne, this time to Victoria Park to play . It was a shock to many to see Geelong be competitive as the unbeaten Collingwood were given "such a scare as they have not had for a long time past." A gallant Geelong were losers by four points. After three rounds, zero wins, three loses.
In Round 4, Geelong recorded its first win against  at the Corio Oval. It was a very fast match, with great kicking and marking skills. A great second quarter was enough for Geelong to win by 22 points.

June 
When an in-form  visited Geelong in Round 5, the wisest did not expect such a demolition. Geelong put the first 23 points on the board and led at half time by 34 points. South Melbourne were in a hopeless position, and though they improved, Geelong were winners by 48 points.  were next to visit Geelong, though with some difficulty as the train to Geelong was delayed for 45 minutes. And so by the fourth quarter, the match was being played in complete darkness. Alas, though with poor goal kicking, Geelong were again victors by seventeen points. Geelong travelled to Melbourne to play  at the Junction Oval. It could be said that Geelong were heavily favored coming into the match against the winless Saints. It was a complete domination by the better twenty, Geelong by 83 points. Geelong scored the highest score in the season with 114 and which remained the league record until 13 May 1899 when Essendon scored a total of 116 against Melbourne. Thus concluded the first round-robin, Geelong had four wins and three losses and were sitting in fourth position. When Geelong met Essendon at the East Melbourne Cricket Ground in Round 8, there was much anticipation about the quality of the match, with two top teams to do battle. It was a terrific hard-fought match for the first three quarters, with Geelong leading by two points at the final change. In the last quarter, all the play was at the Essendon goal, Geelong winners by 25 points.

July 
After a crushing defeat to Melbourne earlier in the season, Geelong made amends in a low-scoring affair at the Corio Oval. Only one goal was kicked in the entire match by Geelong's Eddy James. Geelong winners by five points. In Round 10, Geelong hosted Collingwood at the Corio Oval. Geelong's performance was declared by many old footballers as the "finest exhibition... from Geelong they had seen in years past." Despite Tom Maguire's injury, and thus playing with 19 men, Geelong held Collingwood to one goal all day to win by 42 points. When Geelong travelled to Princes Park to play Carlton, few gave Carlton any chance of winning. Though it was a crowded and disorganised game, Geelong won by 50 points. In Round 11, Geelong travelled to Melbourne to play South Melbourne at the Lake Oval. In front of a large crowd, the game was close for the first three quarters. However, it was Geelong who lasted longer and were winners by twelve points. For the third week in a row, Geelong travelled to Melbourne, this time to the Brunswick Street Oval to play Fitzroy. Fitzroy had only won 4 games from 12, and when Fitzroy were only one point behind at three-quarter time, the in-form visitors experienced an "uncomfortable shake-up". Geelong scored twelve points to one in the final quarter to win a close match by twelve points. With two matches left and being ten premiership points ahead of fifth place South Melbourne, Geelong qualified for the round-robin finals.

August 
In the last match of the home-and-away season, Geelong hosted St Kilda at the Corio Oval. The winless St Kilda had one last chance to "break their duck", and they had no chance of qualifying for the finals. As Geelong had qualified for the finals in the week prior, the match was a dead rubber. St Kilda never had a chance, scoring only a goal "bare" in each of the first three quarters. Geelong winners by 78 points. Thus, concluded the home-and-away season, with Geelong finishing on top of the ladder by percentage with 11 wins and 3 losses. There was a great deal of controversy surrounding which ground the finals should be played on. Originally, it was decided that the ground would be determined by lots. However, league representatives from the metropolitan clubs had a meeting and decided none of the finals matches shall be played in Geelong. Geelong was therefore scheduled to play Essendon at the Melbourne Cricket Ground on the 14 August. The first round of the round-robin finals were postponed after torrential rain. It was then decided to redraw the first round of finals matches with the match containing Geelong to be played at the Corio Oval. The result of the draw was as follows: Melbourne vs. Collingwood at the Melbourne Cricket Ground; Geelong vs. Essendon at the Corio Oval.

Geelong's finals campaign began as its home-and-away season began, meeting Essendon at the Corio Oval. A strong southerly wind meant that most of the scoring would be done at the north end of the ground. Geelong started strong, but was wasteful, as inaccurate kicking saw the first term end with Geelong leading 11–2. With the wind against Geelong in the second quarter, a great defensive display allowed the hosts to maintain a lead at half-time 12–10. As happened in the first quarter, Geelong was wasteful in front of goal in the third quarter, being twelve points ahead at the final change. With twelve minutes to play, Geelong was still twelve points ahead, but it was Essendon kicking four goals in the last quarter who were victors by six points, ending Geelong's eleven game run. With a loss in the first match, Geelong needed two wins to have any chance of winning the premiership. Geelong met the loser of the other first-round final, Melbourne on Fitzroy's ground, the Brunswick Street Oval. Melbourne had a westerly wind towards their goals in the first quarter, and made full advantage of it, leading 20–3 at the first break. Geelong chipped away at Melbourne's lead in the second term but was still behind by eight points at the main break. Geelong was again better in the third quarter though did not have much to show for it, being behind by three points at the final break. A few behinds later at the scores were level midway through the last quarter. Moments later, Eddy James scored the final goal of the match with Geelong holding on to win by nine points.

September 
Per the finals system, for Geelong to be premiers, they are required to beat Collingwood, for Essendon to lose to Melbourne, and to beat Essendon in a play-off the following week. Geelong met Collingwood at the East Melbourne Cricket Ground in the final match of the round-robin series. Geelong started very well, with a strong northerly wind blowing, Geelong took full advantage of it scoring five goals, two behinds to nil. Though Collingwood had the wind in the second quarter, they failed to take advantage, and the half time score was 44–18. The two clubs, who prior, were on friendly terms, showed an unsportsmanlike display for most of the third quarter. The main culprits, one from each team, were Harry Dowdall of Collingwood, and Jim McShane of Geelong. Alas, the quarter was fairly even, eight points to seven. With Geelong ahead by 27 points at the final change, many thought there was no chance for Collingwood to come back. However, with the wind in the fourth quarter, Collingwood held Geelong scoreless but was unable to score enough points to claim victory. Geelong winners by four points. Though Geelong won the match, they did not win the premiership, because at the same time Essendon had beaten Melbourne to claim the premiership as they were undefeated in the finals series.

Results

Ladder

Finals ladder

Notable events 
 The first round finals match between Geelong and Essendon at the Corio Oval was the only finals match to be played in Geelong until 2013.

References

Geelong Football Club seasons
1897 in Australian rules football